Henna is a 1991 Indian romance drama film, written by Khwaja Ahmad Abbas, produced and directed by Randhir Kapoor. It stars Rishi Kapoor, along with Pakistani actress Zeba Bakhtiyar in the title role and Ashwini Bhave. This film was planned and started by director Raj Kapoor, but due to his death during the filming, the remaining portions were directed by his eldest son Randhir. It is considered as the last film of Raj Kapoor. The dialogues of the film were written by the Pakistani writer Haseena Moin. The film was a critical and a commercial success and was also India's submission for the Academy Award for Best Foreign Language Film, but was not accepted as a nominee.

Plot
Chandar Prakash (Rishi Kapoor), who lives in Srinagar, is due to be engaged and married to Chandni Kaul (Ashwini Bhave), whom he calls Chand. On the day of the engagement, he experiences an accident, and mistakenly strays into the Pakistani side of Kashmir. A native girl, Henna (Zeba Bakhtiar), falls in love with him; this is amidst the controversial Indian-Pakistani tension in Kashmir, which leads to him being suspected, by the Pakistani police, of being an Indian spy.

Beautiful Henna Khan lives a transient life near the river Jhelum, in Pakistan, with her widowed dad, Khan Baba, and three brothers Ashraf, Razzak and Zaman. One day, she comes across an unconscious man who has been washed ashore. Khan Baba, Gul Bibi (the village doctor) and Henna take this stranger in and nurse him back to health, only to find out that he has lost his memory. The man, in his sleep, cries out the name "Chand!", thus everyone starts calling him by that name. Soon, he is well enough to walk around and starts working for Gul Bibi, helping her make clay pots. Henna falls in love and would like to marry him, much to the chagrin of Daroga Shahbaaz Khan (Raza Murad), who has already been married twice; according to Shariat law, he can marry twice more. Khan Baba arranges the marriage of Henna and Chand; a day is set for the marriage. On the day of the wedding, Chand finally regains his memory. The family  finds out that “Chand” is actually Chandar, and he is neither a Muslim nor Pakistani. He is from India, having strayed over the border to Pakistan after a random car accident. The group decides to ensure a safe passage for Chand to get back home.

The first attempt is foiled, due to one of Henna’s brothers colluding with Shahbaaz Khan. The second attempt succeeds, but Henna ultimately loses her life in the chaos.

The film ends with Chandar asking why war must be.

Cast
Rishi Kapoor as Chandar Prakash
Zeba Bakhtiar as Henna Khan
Ashwini Bhave as Chandni Kaul
Kulbhushan Kharbanda as Devraj Kaul
Reema Lagoo as Anuradha Kaul
Saeed Jaffrey as Khan Baba
Farida Jalal as Gul Bibi
Mohnish Behl as Captain Surendra
Kiran Kumar as Ashraf
Shafi Inamdar as Pak Police Superintendent Iqbal
Dilip Dhawan as Razzaq
Arun Verma as Zaman
Arun Bakshi as Pak Police Constable Nawabdin
Raza Murad as Pak Police Daroga Shahbaaz Khan

Production
The Kashmir part of the film was shot in Manali, Himachal Pradesh. Some parts were shot in Pakistan (Murree, Islamabad), Switzerland and Austria.

Soundtrack
Lyrics by Ravindra Jain, Naqsh Lyallpuri and Maulana Qudsi.

Reception
The film was a hit, especially given the locations it was shot in, and for the excellent musical score by Ravindra Jain, which spawned internationally-known hits such as "Main Hoon Khush Rang (I’m Happy)", "Anaaradana (Pomegranate)" and "Der Na Ho Jaaye Kahin (Don’t Be Late)”.

Zeba Bakhtiar's performance in the title role was much acclaimed, garnering her a nomination under the Best Actress category at the Filmfare Awards. She, alongside Salma Agha and Saba Qamar, is one of the only Pakistani actresses to be nominated at the Filmfare Awards.

Farida Jalal's performance as Bibi Gul was also much appreciated; she won the Filmfare Award for Best Supporting Actress. The film also picked up several other nominations, including Best Film and Best Director.

The movie marked the Hindi film debut of actress Ashwini Bhave, who played one of the  prominent roles in the story. She subsequently gained much popularity from the success of the film.

Awards 

 37th Filmfare Awards

Won

 Best Supporting Actress – Farida Jalal
 Best Cinematography – Radhu Karmakar

Nominated

 Best Film – Randhir Kapoor, Rajiv Kapoor
 Best Director – Randhir Kapoor
 Best Actress – Zeba Bakhtiar
 Best Supporting Actor – Saeed Jaffrey
Best Female Debut – Zeba Bakhtiar
Best Lyricist – Ravindra Jain for "Main Hoon Khushrang"

See also
 List of submissions to the 64th Academy Awards for Best Foreign Language Film
 List of Indian submissions for the Academy Award for Best Foreign Language Film

References

External links
 

1991 films
1990s Hindi-language films
1990s Urdu-language films
Films scored by Ravindra Jain
Films set in India
Films set in Islamabad
Films set in Jammu and Kashmir
Films set in Lahore
Films set in Pakistan
Films set in Punjab, Pakistan
Films shot in Austria
Films shot in India
Films shot in Islamabad
Films shot in Manali, Himachal Pradesh
Films shot in Punjab, Pakistan
Films shot in Pakistan
Films shot in Switzerland
Indian romantic drama films
India–Pakistan relations in popular culture
Kashmir conflict in films
R. K. Films films
Urdu-language Indian films